Team Fixit.no was a UCI Continental team founded in 2014 and based in Norway. It participates in UCI Continental Circuits races. The team disbanded at the end of the 2017 season.

Team roster

Major wins
2015
Stages 9 & 10 Tour du Maroc, Filip Eidsheim

2017
 National Road Race Championships, Matti Manninen
Stage 3 Tour de Hongrie, Matti Manninen

References

UCI Continental Teams (Europe)
Cycling teams based in Norway
Cycling teams established in 2014
Cycling teams disestablished in 2017
Defunct cycling teams based in Norway
2014 establishments in Norway